Kiwaia parapleura is a moth in the family Gelechiidae. It was described by Edward Meyrick in 1886. It is found in New Zealand.

The wingspan is about 16 mm. The forewings are dark fuscous with a broad pale whitish-ochreous streak along the inner margin from the base to the apex, occupying nearly half of the wing. There are three indistinct small black discal spots, sometimes obsolete, the first in the middle, the second on the lower margin of the dark fuscous portion very obliquely before the first and the third in the disc beyond middle. The hindwings are whitish grey.

References

Kiwaia
Moths described in 1886
Moths of New Zealand
Endemic fauna of New Zealand
Taxa named by Edward Meyrick
Endemic moths of New Zealand